Cérilly is a commune in the Allier department in central France.

It is in close proximity to the largest and oldest untouched oak forest in western Europe: the Forest of Tronçais. Many oak trees exceed 250 years in age. The Troncais (pronounced: Tronssay) forest was first planted during the 13th century and used continuously since the late 17th century and until the early 19th century to supply masts and spars to the old French navy. It is now a state forest which supplies much of the choice oak used in making the best wine barrels that are used mostly in Burgundy.

Geography 
Cérilly is located in the bocage bourbonnais natural region, spanning a sixth of la Forêt de Tronçais.

Population

See also
Communes of the Allier department

References

External links

 Official website 

Communes of Allier
Allier communes articles needing translation from French Wikipedia